Big Girls Don't Cry may refer to:

Music
 Big Girls Don't Cry (Lynn Anderson album), 1968
 Big Girls Don't Cry (The Weather Girls album), 1986
 "Big Girls Don't Cry" (Fergie song), 2007
 "Big Girls Don't Cry" (The Four Seasons song), 1962
 "Big Girls Don't Cry" (Lynn Anderson song), 1968

Other uses
 Big Girls Don't Cry (book), a 2010 nonfiction book by Rebecca Traister
 Big Girls Don't Cry (film), a 2002 German film
 "Big Girls Don't Cry" (The Sopranos), a television episode

See also 
 Big Girls Don't Cry... They Get Even, a 1992 comedy film
 "Big Girls Don't Fly", an episode of Lois & Clark: The New Adventures of Superman
 "Big Girls Cry", a 2014 song by Sia
 Big Boys Don't Cry (disambiguation)